This is a list of members of the Victorian Legislative Assembly from 1996 to 1999, as elected at the 1996 state election:

 In December 1996, the Liberal member for Gippsland West, Alan Brown, resigned. Independent candidate Susan Davies won the resulting by-election on 1 February 1997.
 On 11 November 1997, the Liberal member for Mitcham, Roger Pescott, resigned. Labor candidate Tony Robinson won the resulting by-election on 13 December 1997.
 On 3 July 1998, the Labor member for Northcote, Tony Sheehan, resigned. Labor candidate Mary Delahunty won the resulting state by-election on 15 August 1998.
 The member for Frankston East, Peter McLellan, was elected as a member of the Liberal Party, but resigned on 24 July 1998 and subsequently served out the remainder of his term as an independent.

Members of the Parliament of Victoria by term
20th-century Australian politicians